South Korea competed at the 2001 World Championships in Athletics from August 3 to 12. A team of 7 athletes was announced in preparation for the competition.

Results

Men

Women

References
Result by Events. 

World Championships in Athletics
2001
Nations at the 2001 World Championships in Athletics